Luis Felipe Méliz Linares (born August 11, 1979 in Santa Clara, Villa Clara) is a male Spanish long jumper of Cuban origin.

Méliz 's personal best is 8.43 metres, achieved in June 2000 in Jena.

Achievements

References

1979 births
Living people
Cuban male long jumpers
Olympic athletes of Cuba
Spanish male long jumpers
Spanish people of Cuban descent
Athletes (track and field) at the 1999 Pan American Games
Athletes (track and field) at the 2003 Pan American Games
Athletes (track and field) at the 2000 Summer Olympics
Athletes (track and field) at the 2008 Summer Olympics
Athletes (track and field) at the 2012 Summer Olympics
Olympic athletes of Spain
European Athletics Championships medalists
Pan American Games medalists in athletics (track and field)
Pan American Games silver medalists for Cuba
Pan American Games bronze medalists for Cuba
Universiade medalists in athletics (track and field)
Universiade silver medalists for Cuba
Competitors at the 2001 Goodwill Games
Medalists at the 1999 Pan American Games
Medalists at the 2003 Pan American Games
People from Santa Clara, Cuba